Jorge Santoro Herrmann (died 26 February 2011) was a Brazilian professional football player and coach.

Career
Born in Belo Horizonte, Santoro moved to South Africa in 1964 to play for Hellenic, and also later played for Highlands Park before retiring due to injuries sustained in a car crash back in Brazil. Upon his return to South Africa, Santoro was active as a coach, working for such teams as Moroka Swallows, Lusitano and Giant Blackpool.

References
Kickoff.com - R.I.P. Jorge Santoro Herrmann

1940s births
2011 deaths
Brazilian footballers
Brazilian football managers
Highlands Park F.C. players
Hellenic F.C. players
Berea Park F.C. players
Brazilian expatriates in South Africa
Association football midfielders
Corinthians F.C. (Johannesburg) players
Powerlines F.C. players
Arcadia Shepherds F.C. players
Moroka Swallows F.C. managers
Brazilian expatriate football managers
Brazilian expatriate footballers
Lusitano F.C. (South Africa) managers
Expatriate soccer players in South Africa
Expatriate soccer managers in South Africa
Footballers from Belo Horizonte